Zhan Vensanovych Beleniuk (also transliterated Jean Vensanovich Belenyuk; born 24 January 1991) is a Ukrainian Greco-Roman wrestler and politician. In 2019, he became the first black member of the Ukrainian Parliament.

Early life
Beleniuk was born in 1991 in Kyiv to a father from Rwanda. His father was a pilot who studied in Kyiv at the National Aviation University and died during the Genocide against the Tutsi in Rwanda when Beleniuk was only 3 years old.

Beleniuk began wrestling in 2000 when he was nine years old.

Career
In 2010, Beleniuk won the silver medal at the Junior World Championships. In 2011, he became the Junior European Champion amongst, and won bronze at the World Championship. In 2012, he won the bronze medal at the European Championships. In 2013, he won bronze again at the Summer Universiade.

In 2014, he won a gold medal at the 2014 European Wrestling Championships, and bronze at the World Championships.

In 2015, he won the silver medal at the first European Games in Azerbaijan. On 10 September 2015, after winning against then the ruling World Champion and then Champion of Asia, Uzbek Rustam Assakalov scoring 6:0, Beleniuk won gold at the 2015 World Wrestling Championships in under-85 kg weight category.

In 2016, he won gold at the 2016 European Wrestling Championships, followed by the silver medal at the 2016 Summer Olympics in Rio de Janeiro.

In 2021, he won a gold medal at the 2020 Summer Olympics in Tokyo.

Beleniuk was briefly a member of the National Olympic Committee of Ukraine. He left the National Olympic Committee in January 2023 due to disagreement with its new President Vadym Gutzeit.

Politics 
Beleniuk was elected a deputy to the Verkhovna Rada in July 2019 Ukrainian parliamentary election as a member of the Servant of the People political party. He was one of the first ten candidates on the party's electoral list.

Achievements

World and olympic records

! colspan="8"| World Championships/Olympic Games Matches
|-
!  Res.
!  Record
!  Opponent
!  Score
!  Date
!  Event
!  Location
!  Notes
|-
! style=background:white colspan=9 | 
|-
|Win
|4-0
|align=left| Viktor Lőrincz
|style="font-size:88%"|5-1
|style="font-size:88%"|2021-08-04
|style="font-size:88%" rowspan=4|2020 Summer Olympics
|style="text-align:left;font-size:88%;" rowspan=4| Tokyo, Japan
|style="text-align:left;font-size:88%;"|
|-
|Win
|3-0
|align=left| Ivan Huklek
|style="font-size:88%"|7-1
|style="font-size:88%" rowspan=3|2021-08-03
|style="text-align:left;font-size:88%;"|
|-
|Win
|2-0
|align=left| Bachir Sid Azara
|style="font-size:88%"|1-1
|style="text-align:left;font-size:88%;"|
|-
|Win
|1-0
|align=left| Zurab Datunashvili 
|style="font-size:88%"|3-1
|style="text-align:left;font-size:88%;"|
|-
! style=background:white colspan=9 | 
|-
|Win
|3-1
|align=left| Denis Kudla
|style="font-size:88%"|1-1
|style="font-size:88%" rowspan=2|2021-04-24
|style="font-size:88%" rowspan=4|2021 European Championships
|style="text-align:left;font-size:88%;" rowspan=4| Warsaw, Poland
|style="text-align:left;font-size:88%;"|
|-
|Win
|2-1
|align=left| Vjekoslav Luburić
|style="font-size:88%"|7-1
|style="text-align:left;font-size:88%;"|
|-
|Loss
|1-1
|align=left| Zurab Datunashvili
|style="font-size:88%"|1-1
|style="font-size:88%" rowspan=2|2021-04-23
|style="text-align:left;font-size:88%;"|
|-
|Win
|1-0
|align=left| Oskar Johansson
|style="font-size:88%"|7-1
|style="text-align:left;font-size:88%;"|
|-

! style=background:white colspan=9 | 
|-
|Win
|5-0
|align=left| Viktor Lőrincz
|style="font-size:88%"|2-1
|style="font-size:88%"|2019-09-16
|style="font-size:88%" rowspan=5|2019 World Championships
|style="text-align:left;font-size:88%;" rowspan=5| Nur-Sultan, Kazakhstan
|style="text-align:left;font-size:88%;"|
|-
|Win
|4-0
|align=left| Denis Kudla
|style="font-size:88%"|2-1
|style="font-size:88%" rowspan=4|2019-09-15
|style="text-align:left;font-size:88%;"|
|-
|Win
|3-0
|align=left| Mikalai Stadub
|style="font-size:88%"|3-1
|style="text-align:left;font-size:88%;"|
|-
|Win
|2-0
|align=left| Ivan Huklek
|style="font-size:88%"|7-1
|style="text-align:left;font-size:88%;"|
|-
|Win
|1-0
|align=left| Alfonso Leyva
|style="font-size:88%"|5-1
|style="text-align:left;font-size:88%;"|
|-
! style=background:white colspan=9 | 
|-
|Win
|4-0
|align=left| Islam Abbasov
|style="font-size:88%"|3-1
|style="font-size:88%"|2019-06-30
|style="font-size:88%" rowspan=4|2019 European Games
|style="text-align:left;font-size:88%;" rowspan=4| Minsk, Belarus
|style="text-align:left;font-size:88%;"|
|-
|Win
|3-0
|align=left| Radzik Kuliyeu
|style="font-size:88%"|3-1
|style="font-size:88%" rowspan=3|2019-06-29
|style="text-align:left;font-size:88%;"|
|-
|Win
|2-0
|align=left| Arkadiusz Kułynycz
|style="font-size:88%"|9-1
|style="text-align:left;font-size:88%;"|
|-
|Win
|1-0
|align=left| Maksim Manukyan
|style="font-size:88%"|5-1
|style="text-align:left;font-size:88%;"|
|-
! style=background:white colspan=9 | 
|-
|Win
|4-0
|align=left| Islam Abbasov
|style="font-size:88%"|5-1
|style="font-size:88%"|2019-04-13
|style="font-size:88%" rowspan=4|2019 European Championships
|style="text-align:left;font-size:88%;" rowspan=4| Bucharest, Romania
|style="text-align:left;font-size:88%;"|
|-
|Win
|3-0
|align=left| Eividas Stankevičius
|style="font-size:88%"|5-1
|style="font-size:88%" rowspan=3|2019-04-12
|style="text-align:left;font-size:88%;"|
|-
|Win
|2-0
|align=left| Erik Szilvássy
|style="font-size:88%"|3-1
|style="text-align:left;font-size:88%;"|
|-
|Win
|1-0
|align=left| Ivan Huklek
|style="font-size:88%"|6-1
|style="text-align:left;font-size:88%;"|
|-
! style=background:white colspan=9 |
|-
|Loss
|4-1
|align=left| Metehan Başar
|style="font-size:88%"|1-2
|style="font-size:88%"|2018-10-27
|style="font-size:88%" rowspan=5|2018 World Championships
|style="text-align:left;font-size:88%;" rowspan=5| Budapest, Hungary
|style="text-align:left;font-size:88%;"|
|-
|Win
|4-0
|align=left| Islam Abbasov
|style="font-size:88%"|5-1
|style="font-size:88%" rowspan=4|2018-10-26
|style="text-align:left;font-size:88%;"|
|-
|Win
|3-0
|align=left| Hossein Nouri
|style="font-size:88%"|4-2
|style="text-align:left;font-size:88%;"|
|-
|Win
|2-0
|align=left| Artur Shahinyan
|style="font-size:88%"|4-1
|style="text-align:left;font-size:88%;"|
|-
|Win
|1-0
|align=left| Eividas Stankevičius
|style="font-size:88%"|4-2
|style="text-align:left;font-size:88%;"|
|-
! style=background:white colspan=9 |
|-
|Loss
|3-1
|align=left| Davit Chakvetadze
|style="font-size:88%"|2-9
|style="font-size:88%" rowspan=4|2016-08-15
|style="font-size:88%" rowspan=4|2016 Summer Olympics
|style="text-align:left;font-size:88%;" rowspan=4| Rio de Janeiro
|style="text-align:left;font-size:88%;"|
|-
|Win
|3-0
|align=left| Javid Hamzatau
|style="font-size:88%"|6-0
|style="text-align:left;font-size:88%;"|
|-
|Win
|2-0
|align=left| Nikolay Bayryakov
|style="font-size:88%"|10-1
|style="text-align:left;font-size:88%;"|
|-
|Win
|1-0
|align=left| Ahmed Othman
|style="font-size:88%"|9-0
|style="text-align:left;font-size:88%;"|
|-
! style=background:white colspan=9 | 
|-
|Win
|4-0
|align=left| Roberti Kobliashvili
|style="font-size:88%"|5-2
|style="font-size:88%" rowspan=4|2016-03-13
|style="font-size:88%" rowspan=4|European Championships
|style="text-align:left;font-size:88%;" rowspan=4| Riga, Latvia
|style="text-align:left;font-size:88%;"|
|-
|Win
|3-0
|align=left| Laimutis Adomaitis
|style="font-size:88%"|2-1
|style="text-align:left;font-size:88%;"|
|-
|Win
|2-0
|align=left| Denis Kudla
|style="font-size:88%"|6-1
|style="text-align:left;font-size:88%;"|
|-
|Win
|1-0
|align=left| Kristofer Johansson
|style="font-size:88%"|5-0
|style="text-align:left;font-size:88%;"|
|-
! style=background:white colspan=9 |
|-
|Win
|6-0
|align=left| Rustam Assakalov
|style="font-size:88%"|6-0
|style="font-size:88%" rowspan=6|2015-09-09
|style="font-size:88%" rowspan=6|2015 World Championships
|style="text-align:left;font-size:88%;" rowspan=6| Las Vegas, NV
|style="text-align:left;font-size:88%;"|
|-
|Win
|5-0
|align=left| Saman Tahmasebi
|style="font-size:88%"|3-1
|style="text-align:left;font-size:88%;"|
|-
|Win
|4-0
|align=left| Damian Janikowski
|style="font-size:88%"|2-1
|style="text-align:left;font-size:88%;"|
|-
|Win
|3-0
|align=left| Viktor Lőrincz
|style="font-size:88%"|3-1
|style="text-align:left;font-size:88%;"|
|-
|Win
|2-0
|align=left| Ramsin Azizsir
|style="font-size:88%"|3-0
|style="text-align:left;font-size:88%;"|
|-
|Win
|1-0
|align=left| Alfonso Leyva
|style="font-size:88%"|6-2
|style="text-align:left;font-size:88%;"|
|-
! style=background:white colspan=9 |
|-
|Loss
|4-1
|align=left| Davit Chakvetadze
|style="font-size:88%"|2-3
|style="font-size:88%" rowspan=5|2015-06-14
|style="font-size:88%" rowspan=5|2015 European Games
|style="text-align:left;font-size:88%;" rowspan=5| Baku, Azerbaijan
|style="text-align:left;font-size:88%;"|
|-
|Win
|4-0
|align=left| Maksim Manukyan
|style="font-size:88%"|12-4
|style="text-align:left;font-size:88%;"|
|-
|Win
|3-0
|align=left| Metehan Başar
|style="font-size:88%"|3-1
|style="text-align:left;font-size:88%;"|
|-
|Win
|2-0
|align=left| Attila Tamas
|style="font-size:88%"|7-0
|style="text-align:left;font-size:88%;"|
|-
|Win
|1-0
|align=left| Dejan Franjković
|style="font-size:88%"|8-0
|style="text-align:left;font-size:88%;"|
|-
! style=background:white colspan=9 |
|-
|Win
|4-1
|align=left| Ramsin Azizsir
|style="font-size:88%"|3-0
|style="font-size:88%" rowspan=5|2014-09-12
|style="font-size:88%" rowspan=5|2014 World Championships
|style="text-align:left;font-size:88%;" rowspan=5| Tashkent, Uzbekistan
|style="text-align:left;font-size:88%;"|
|-
|Loss
|3-1
|align=left| Saman Tahmasebi
|style="font-size:88%"|0-4
|style="text-align:left;font-size:88%;"|
|-
|Win
|3-0
|align=left| Ahmed Othman
|style="font-size:88%"|10-1
|style="text-align:left;font-size:88%;"|
|-
|Win
|2-0
|align=left| Pablo Shorey
|style="font-size:88%"|6-1
|style="text-align:left;font-size:88%;"|
|-
|Win
|1-0
|align=left| Rami Hietaniemi
|style="font-size:88%"|1-0
|style="text-align:left;font-size:88%;"|
|-
! style=background:white colspan=9 |
|-
|Win
|4-1
|align=left| Nursultan Tursynov
|style="font-size:88%"|3-1
|style="font-size:88%" rowspan=5|2013-07-15
|style="font-size:88%" rowspan=5|2013 Summer Universiade
|style="text-align:left;font-size:88%;" rowspan=5| Kazan, Russia
|style="text-align:left;font-size:88%;"|
|-
|Loss
|3-1
|align=left| Maksim Manukyan
|style="font-size:88%"|0-5
|style="text-align:left;font-size:88%;"|
|-
|Win
|3-0
|align=left| Beka Rokva
|style="font-size:88%"|3-1
|style="text-align:left;font-size:88%;"|
|-
|Win
|2-0
|align=left| Tadeusz Michalik
|style="font-size:88%"|3-1
|style="text-align:left;font-size:88%;"|
|-
|Win
|1-0
|align=left| Aslan Atem
|style="font-size:88%"|3-1
|style="text-align:left;font-size:88%;"|
|-

See also
 List of members of the parliament of Ukraine, 2019–24

References

External links

 
 
 
 Jean Vensanovich Beleniuk at Verkhovna Rada 

1991 births
Living people
Ukrainian male sport wrestlers
Olympic wrestlers of Ukraine
Olympic silver medalists for Ukraine
Olympic medalists in wrestling
Wrestlers at the 2016 Summer Olympics
Medalists at the 2016 Summer Olympics
World Wrestling Championships medalists
Universiade medalists in wrestling
Universiade bronze medalists for Ukraine
European Games gold medalists for Ukraine
European Games silver medalists for Ukraine
European Games medalists in wrestling
Wrestlers at the 2015 European Games
Wrestlers at the 2019 European Games
Sportspeople from Kyiv
Interregional Academy of Personnel Management alumni
National University of Ukraine on Physical Education and Sport alumni
Ukrainian people of Rwandan descent
Hutu people
Recipients of the Order of Merit (Ukraine), 3rd class
Servant of the People (political party) politicians
Ukrainian sportsperson-politicians
Ninth convocation members of the Verkhovna Rada
21st-century Ukrainian politicians
European Wrestling Championships medalists
Medalists at the 2013 Summer Universiade
Wrestlers at the 2020 Summer Olympics
Medalists at the 2020 Summer Olympics
Olympic gold medalists for Ukraine